The Lanzhou–Haikou Expressway, designated as G75 and commonly referred to as the Lanhai Expressway is an expressway in China that connects the cities of Lanzhou, Gansu, and Haikou, Hainan. When fully complete, it will be  in length. It is one of the most important routes between Northwest China and the Southwest, and considered one of the developmental axes of Development of Western China.

Route

Gansu

G75 was fully completed in Gansu with the opening of the Wudu-Weiyuan section on 1 January 2021.

Starting from the south of Lanzhou, the expressway enters the New Qidaoliang tunnel (length ) through the Xinglongshan mountains, from where it follows the Tao River parallel to G212. Past Lintao, the route diverges from the Tao river valley and passes through hilly landscape through a couple of tunnels until exiting in the Wei River valley. In Min County, the expressway parallels G212 again until Longnan, exiting Gansu through a mountainous valley by numerous tunnels and viaducts.

Sichuan
The expressway is under construction from the Gansu border to Nanchong, and complete from Nanchong to the Chongqing border.

Chongqing
The expressway is complete in Chongqing.

Guizhou

The expressway is complete in Guizhou. The portion of it connecting Guiyang and Zunyi is referred to as the Kaima Expressway.

Guangxi
The expressway is under construction from the Guizhou border to Du'an Yao Autonomous County, and complete from Du'an to the Guangdong border.

Guangdong
The expressway is complete from the Guangxi border to Zhanjiang. At Zhanjiang, the expressway is under construction as the fixed bridge link from Guangdong to Hainan is still under construction.

Hainan
When completed, the southern terminus of the expressway will be in Haikou, Hainan. Hainan is an island and currently not connected to the rest of Mainland China by a fixed road link. A bridge is being built over the Qiongzhou Strait, separating Guangdong from Hainan and will carry the Lanzhou–Haikou Expressway to Hainan.

Major accidents 
The northern terminus of G75 in Lanzhou has been the site of hundreds of accidents, totaling at least 42 deaths since 2012. Trucks having brake failure or being overloaded, and drunk drivers cause most of the accidents. The toll station is located several kilometers from the actual terminus of the expressway to reduce the severity of accidents. With the opening of the Lanzhou South Ring Expressway, heavy trucks are not allowed on the downhill section any more.

On 7 November 2015, a truck caught fire in the Qinggangshao tunnel between Chongqing and Zunyi. The driver managed to drive the burning truck out of the tunnel to a safe parking spot, preventing any injuries.

On 9 November 2015, two trucks collided with a bus in Wusheng, resulting in 6 deaths and 26 injured people.

Detailed Itinerary

References

Chinese national-level expressways
Expressways in Gansu
Expressways in Sichuan
Expressways in Chongqing
Expressways in Guizhou
Expressways in Guangxi
Expressways in Guangdong
Expressways in Hainan